Fernando Sánchez Cipitria (born 12 September 1971), known simply as Fernando, is a Spanish former professional footballer who played mostly as a left midfielder, currently a manager.

He appeared in 201 La Liga matches over seven seasons (27 goals), for four clubs.

Club career
Fernando was born in Madrid. An unsuccessful youth graduate from Real Madrid, he made his La Liga debut with Real Valladolid in the 1995–96 season, with the side being coached by a young Rafael Benítez and also featuring former Real Madrid Castilla teammates José Luis Santamaría and Alberto Marcos.

In the following campaign, with Fernando scoring a career-best 11 goals, the Castile and León team qualified to the UEFA Cup after finishing seventh. Subsequently, he signed with Real Betis, posting two respectable top-flight seasons.

Fernando joined Deportivo de La Coruña for 1999–2000, and appeared in 19 games for the Galicians in their first-ever championship title. He would, however, soon be deemed surplus to requirements, and served three consecutive loans until his retirement at 32: he played the first part of the 2002–03 campaign at Hannover 96 in Germany, alongside teammates Jaime (also with him at Real Madrid) and José Manuel, but soon grew unsettled and returned to Spain.

After retiring, Fernando focused on youth training. In 2012, he joined Evergrande Football School founded by Guangzhou Evergrande FC, where he worked as technical director and head coach.

Fernando joined Xinjiang Tianshan Leopard FC's youth side in the 2018 season, and was promoted to the first team on 1 January 2019.

International career
Fernando earned two caps for the Spain national team, over the course of two months. His first arrived on 28 January 1998, as he came on as an 82nd-minute substitute for Guillermo Amor in a 0–1 away friendly loss in France.

References

External links

1971 births
Living people
Footballers from Madrid
Spanish footballers
Association football midfielders
La Liga players
Segunda División players
Segunda División B players
Tercera División players
Real Madrid C footballers
Real Madrid Castilla footballers
CD Leganés players
Real Valladolid players
Real Betis players
Deportivo de La Coruña players
CA Osasuna players
Córdoba CF players
Bundesliga players
Hannover 96 players
Spain international footballers
Spanish expatriate footballers
Expatriate footballers in Germany
Spanish expatriate sportspeople in Germany
Spanish football managers
Tercera División managers
China League One managers
Xinjiang Tianshan Leopard F.C. managers
Spanish expatriate football managers
Expatriate football managers in China
Spanish expatriate sportspeople in China